Trnava is a village and a municipality in Osijek-Baranja County, Croatia. In the 2011 Croatian census, there were 1,600 inhabitants, 90% of whom were Croats.

Settlements
 Dragotin
 Hrkanovci Đakovački
 Kondrić
 Lapovci
 Svetoblažje
 Trnava

References

Municipalities of Croatia
Populated places in Osijek-Baranja County